Paion is a former municipality in Achaea, West Greece, Greece. Its population in 2011 was 1,055. The seat of the municipality was in Dafni.  The municipality was created after the Greek War of Independence and was dissolved in 1912.  It was recreated in 1998 under the Capodistrian Plan. Since the 2011 local government reform it is part of the municipality Kalavryta, of which it is a municipal unit. The municipal unit has an area of 99.325 km2.

Subdivisions
The municipal unit Paion is subdivided into the following communities (constituent villages in brackets):
Amygdalea
Chovoli (Ano Chovoli, Kato Chovoli)
Dafni
Nasia
Paos (Paos, Vesini, Dechounaiika, Palaios Paos, Potamia)
Pefko
Skotani (Skotani, Agios Georgios)

Population

Mayors
Papadimitrakopoulos (1907–1912)

References

External links
Official website
Paion on GTP Travel Pages

Populated places in Achaea